Jarmania is a genus of lichenized fungi in the family Ramalinaceae. This genus was named in honour of S. Jean Jarman (b.1947), a Tasmanian botanist working in Hobart.

The genus was circumscribed by Gintaras Kantvilas in Lichenologist vol.28 on page 230 in 1996.

References

Ramalinaceae
Lichen genera
Lecanorales genera